Brownie's Blues is an album by blues musician Brownie McGhee recorded in 1960 and released on the Bluesville label in 1962.

Reception

AllMusic reviewer Thom Owens stated: "Supported by his longtime accompanist Sonny Terry, as well as second guitarist Benny Foster, Brownie turns in a nicely understated record that's distinguished by surprisingly harmonically complex and jazzy guitar work".

Track listing
All compositions by Brownie McGhee except where noted
 "Jump, Little Children" – 4:36
 "Lonesome Day" – 5:25
 "One Thing for Sure" – 3:20
 "The Killin' Floor" – 3:41
 "Little Black Engine" – 3:44
 "I Don't Know the Reason" – 4:03
 "Trouble in Mind" (Richard M. Jones) – 4:55
 "Everyday I Have the Blues" (Peter Chatman) – 5:15
 "Door to Success" – 4:10

Personnel

Performance
Brownie McGhee – guitar, vocals 
Sonny Terry – harmonica 
Bennie Foster – guitar

It has been suggested that “Bennie Foster” was a pseudonym for Stick McGhee.

Production
Ozzie Cadena – supervision
Rudy Van Gelder – engineer

References

Brownie McGhee albums
1962 albums
Bluesville Records albums
Albums recorded at Van Gelder Studio
Albums produced by Ozzie Cadena